The 18th season of Taniec z gwiazdami, the Polish edition of Dancing With the Stars, started on 4 March 2016. This was the fifth season aired on Polsat. Krzysztof Ibisz and new presenter Paulina Sykut-Jeżyna were the hosts and Beata Tyszkiewicz, Iwona Pavlović, Michał Malitowski and Andrzej Grabowski returned as judges.

On 13 May, Anna Karczmarczyk and her partner Jacek Jeschke were crowned the champions.

Couples

Scores

Red numbers indicate the lowest score for each week.
Green numbers indicate the highest score for each week.
 indicates the couple eliminated that week.
 indicates the returning couple that finished in the bottom two or three.
 this couple withdrew from the competition.
 this couple was eliminated but later returned to the competition.
 indicates the couple saved from elimination by immunity.
 indicates the winning couple.
 indicates the runner-up.
 indicates the couple in third place.

Notes:

Week 1: Anna Karczmarczyk scored 40 out of 40 on her first dance (Tango). It was the highest score ever in Week 1. There was a two-way tie on the second place, with Elżbieta Romanowska and Izu Ugonoh all getting 39 out of 40. Joanna Opozda scored 26 points for her Cha-cha-cha making it the lowest score of the Week. Andrzej & Magdalena were eliminated despite being 5 points from the bottom.

Week 2: Elżbieta Romanowska and Izu Ugonoh got their first perfect scores.  Nikodem Rozbicki scored 27 points for his Jive making it the lowest score of the Week. Dorota & Robert were eliminated despite being 4 points from the bottom.

Week 3: Elżbieta Romanowska received her second perfect score for Tango. Nikodem Rozbicki scored 25 points for his Cha-cha-cha making it the lowest score of the Week. Waldemar & Nina were eliminated despite being 9 points from the bottom.

Week 4:  Elżbieta Romanowska got perfect score for her Jive, having scored 3 perfect scores in a row. Nikodem Rozbicki scored 24 points for his Samba making it the lowest score of the Week. Joanna & Kamil were eliminated despite being 4 points from the bottom.

Average score chart 
This table only counts for dances scored on a traditional 40-points scale.

Highest and lowest scoring performances 
The best and worst performances in each dance according to the judges' 40-point scale are as follows:

Couples' highest and lowest scoring dances

According to the traditional 40-point scale:

Weekly scores
Unless indicated otherwise, individual judges scores in the charts below (given in parentheses) are listed in this order from left to right: Andrzej Grabowski, Iwona Pavlović, Beata Tyszkiewicz and Michał Malitowski.

Week 1: Season Premiere
Running order

Week 2
Individual judges scores in the charts below (given in parentheses) are listed in this order from left to right: Andrzej Grabowski, Iwona Pavlović, Beata Tyszkiewicz and Stefano Terrazzino.
Running order

Week 3: My Place on Earth
Running order

Week 4: Spring Breakers
Running order

Week 5: Switch-Up Week
The couples were required to switch professional partners this week and learn a new style of dance. Due to the nature of the week, no elimination took place at the end of the show. At the end of the show it was revealed that Izu & Valeriya had the highest combined total of judges' scores and viewer votes, and the top three were still Elżbieta & Jan and Anna & Rafał, while Rafał & Agnieszka had the lowest total.
Running order

Week 6: Animated Films Week
Running order

Week 7: Dedications Dances
Running order

Week 8: Movie Week (Trio Challenge)
Running order

Week 9: Semi-final
Running order

Dance-off

Running order

Week 10: Season Finale
Running order

Dance chart
The celebrities and professional partners danced one of these routines for each corresponding week:
Week 1 (Season Premiere): Cha-cha-cha, Waltz, Jive, Tango
Week 2: One unlearned dance (introducing Foxtrot, Rumba)
Week 3 (My Place on Earth): One unlearned dance (introducing Paso Doble, Viennese Waltz, Jazz)
Week 4 (Spring Breakers): One unlearned dance (introducing Quickstep, Samba)
Week 5 (Switch-Up Week): One unlearned dance (introducing Contemporary)
Week 6 (Animated Films Week): One unlearned dance and dance-offs
Week 7 (Dedications Dances): One repeated dance and one unlearned dance (introducing Salsa)  
Week 8 (Movie Week/Trio Challenge): Two unlearned dance (second show trio dances) (introducing Argentine Tango)  
Week 9 (Semi-final): One repeated dance and one unlearned dance and dance-offs
Week 10 (Season Final):  Judges' choice and Freestyle and couple's favorite dance of the season

 Highest scoring dance
 Lowest scoring dance
 Performed, but not scored
 Gained bonus points for winning this dance-off
 Gained no bonus points for losing this dance-off

Call-out order

 This couple came in first place with the judges.
 This couple came in last place with the judges.
 This couple came in last place with the judges and was eliminated.
 This couple was eliminated.
 This couple withdrew from the competition.
 This couple was saved from elimination by immunity.
 This couple won the competition.
 This couple came in second in the competition.
 This couple came in third in the competition.

Guest performances

Rating figures

Notes

References

External links
 

Season 18
2016 Polish television seasons